Penang Free School (PFS), located at Green Lane in George Town, Penang, Malaysia, is the oldest English-medium school in Southeast Asia. Founded in 1816, its academic achievements lead to its inclusion in the Malaysian Ministry of Education's Cluster School and High Performance School systems.

This secondary school has been an all-boys school since its inception, although girls are now admitted for Form 6. In addition, the school has produced several notable Malaysian and Singaporean personalities, including Tunku Abdul Rahman, P. Ramlee, Wu Lien-teh and Wee Chong Jin; its alumni are known as the 'Old Frees'.

Penang Free School maintains its historical rivalry with St. Xavier's Institution, another school in George Town which also claims the honour of being Malaysia's oldest school.

History

The establishment of a 'free school' that was open to all ethnicities was first mooted by a committee led by Rev. Robert Sparke Hutchings in 1816. It was initially proposed that a boarding school would be built to provide education and daily care for orphans and the poor, and that the boarding school would consist of two blocks, one for male students and another for girls. Local Asian children would be taught in their mother tongues, while English would only be taught for those who desired it.

Penang Free School came into being on 21 October that year, with William Cox as its first principal, and was originally housed at Love Lane. This was a temporary arrangement, as the new school building at the adjoining Farquhar Street was still under construction. The building, situated next to St. George's Church, was completed in 1821.

By the 1890s, as the school building became overcrowded, a tender was called for the construction of a new wing. The new wing, funded mainly by Chinese philanthropists such as Chung Keng Quee, was completed in 1896. Another wing was also built in 1906. In addition, English was made the standard medium of instruction within the school.

By the 1920s, the building was also reaching its maximum capacity. Therefore, plans were drawn up for the relocation of Penang Free School to a suburban site further inland, while the school premises at Farquhar Street was to be turned into a primary school. In 1928, Penang Free School was officially moved to a  site at Green Lane, where it remains to this day. The old school building was turned into Hutchings School; today, this particular building houses the Penang State Museum.

In 1958, the then Prime Minister of Malaya and an alumnus of Penang Free School, Tunku Abdul Rahman, opened the school's Form 6 block, making it the first school in northern Malaya to offer secondary education up to Form 6. More school blocks were added over the years, enabling it to switch to a single-session school system by 1992.

List of principals

The following is a list of principals of Penang Free School.

Notable alumni
Ahmad Ibrahim 
Singapore's Minister for Health (1959–1961) 
Minister for Labour (1961–1962)
Cheah Cheng Hye
Co-founder, Chairman and Co-Chief Investment Officer of Hong Kong's Value Partners Group Limited
Danny Quah 
Li Ka Shing Professor of Economics at the Lee Kuan Yew School of Public Policy, National University of Singapore
Dennis Lee 
Pianist
Eusoff Abdoolcadeer 
Former Malaysian Supreme Court judge
G. Rama Iyer 
Secretary-General of Malaysia's Primary Industries Ministry
Ismail Merican 
Former Director-General of Malaysia's Ministry of Health
Jomo Kwame Sundaram 
Assistant Secretary General for Economic Development in the United Nations Department of Economic and Social Affairs (DESA)
Lim Chong Eu 
Second Chief Minister of Penang
Lim Chong Keat 
Architect of Komtar, the tallest skyscraper in Penang
P. Ramlee 
Film actor, director, singer, songwriter, composer and producer
King Sirajuddin 
Raja of Perlis and former King of Malaysia (2001–2006)
Subramaniam Sathasivam 
Minister of Health (Malaysia), Member of Parliament 
Tan Boon Teik 
Former Attorney-General of Singapore (1967–1992) and a founder of the Singapore Symphony Orchestra
Tan Hock Eng 
President & CEO, Broadcom Ltd
Tan Seang Beng 
Director of Spine Service, Singapore General Hospital
Tengku Ahmad Rithauddeen Ismail 
Former Foreign Minister and Defence Minister (Malaysia)
Tunku Abdul Rahman 
Founding father of Malaya and the first Prime Minister of Malaysia
Wee Chong Jin 
First Chief Justice of Singapore
Wu Lien-teh 
Medical doctor and nominee for the Nobel Prize in Medicine 1935
Yeoh Ghim Seng 
Longest-serving Speaker of the Parliament of Singapore (1970–1989)

Sport House
• P.Ramlee
• Wu Lien Teh
• Pinhorn
• Hargreaves
• Cheeseman 
• Sirajuddin
• Tunku Putra
• Hamilton

Gallery

References

External links
Official website

Buildings and structures in George Town, Penang
Educational institutions established in 1816
1816 establishments in British Malaya
Secondary schools in Malaysia
Publicly funded schools in Malaysia
Boys' schools in Malaysia
Schools in Penang
1810s establishments in Penang